Částkov is a municipality and village in Tachov District in the Plzeň Region of the Czech Republic. It has about 300 inhabitants.

Administrative parts
Villages of Maršovy Chody and Pernolec are administrative parts of Částkov.

References

Villages in Tachov District